Sindre Walstad is a Norwegian handball player.

He made his debut on the Norwegian national team in 1994, and played 85 matches for the national team between 1994 and 2006. He competed at the 2005 World Men's Handball Championship.

References

Year of birth missing (living people)
Living people
Norwegian male handball players